The 2022 Champaign–Urbana Challenger was a professional tennis tournament played on hard courts. It was the 26th edition of the tournament which was part of the 2022 ATP Challenger Tour. It took place in Champaign, Illinois, United States between November 14 and November 20, 2022.

Singles main-draw entrants

Seeds

 1 Rankings are as of November 7, 2022.

Other entrants
The following players received wildcards into the singles main draw:
  Mathis Debru
  Hunter Heck
  Kārlis Ozoliņš

The following players received entry from the qualifying draw:
  August Holmgren
  Strong Kirchheimer
  Patrick Kypson
  Iñaki Montes de la Torre
  Alexander Petrov
  Ethan Quinn

The following player received entry as a lucky loser:
  Evan Zhu

Champions

Singles

 Ben Shelton def.  Aleksandar Vukic 0–6, 6–3, 6–2.

Doubles

 Robert Galloway /  Hans Hach Verdugo def.  Ezekiel Clark /  Alfredo Perez 3–6, 6–3, [10–5].

References

2022 ATP Challenger Tour
2022
Champaign
2022 in sports in Illinois
November 2022 sports events in the United States